Cliff Palace is the largest cliff dwelling in North America. The structure built by the Ancestral Puebloans is located in Mesa Verde National Park in their former homeland region. The cliff dwelling and park are in Montezuma County, in the southwestern corner of Colorado, in the Southwestern United States.

History

Tree-ring dating indicates that construction and refurbishing of Cliff Palace was continuous approximately from 1190 CE through 1260 CE, although the major portion of the building was done within a 20-year time span. The Ancestral Puebloans, also known as Anasazi, who constructed this cliff dwelling and the others like it at Mesa Verde were driven to these defensible positions by "increasing competition amidst changing climatic conditions". Cliff Palace was abandoned by 1300, and while debate remains as to the causes of this, some believe that a series of megadroughts interrupting food production systems is the main cause. Cliff Palace was rediscovered in 1888 by Richard Wetherill and Charlie Mason while they were out looking for stray cattle.

Description
Cliff Palace was constructed primarily out of sandstone, mortar and wooden beams. The sandstone was shaped using harder stones, and a mortar of soil, water and ash was used to hold everything together. "Chinking" stones were placed within the mortar to fill gaps and provide stability. Many of the walls were decorated with colored earthen plasters, which were the first to erode over time.
Many visitors wonder about the relatively small size of the doorways at Cliff Palace; the explanation being that at the time the average man was under , while the average woman was closer to 
Cliff Palace contains 23 kivas (round sunken rooms of ceremonial importance) and 150 rooms and had a population of approximately 100 people. One kiva, in the center of the ruin, is at a point where the entire structure is partitioned by a series of walls with no doorways or other access portals. The walls of this kiva were plastered with one color on one side and a different color on the opposing side. "It is thought that Cliff Palace was a social, administrative site with high ceremonial usage." Archaeologists believe that Cliff Palace contained more clans than the surrounding Mesa Verde communities. This belief stems from the higher ratio of rooms to kivas. Cliff Palace has a room-to-kiva ratio of 9 to 1. The average room-to-kiva ratio for a Mesa Verde community is 12 to 1. This ratio of kivas to rooms may suggest that Cliff Palace might have been the center of a large polity that included surrounding small communities.

A large square tower is to the right and almost reaches the cave "roof". It was in ruins by the 1800s. The National Park Service carefully restored it to its approximate height and stature, making it one of the most memorable buildings in Cliff Palace. Slightly differently colored materials were used to show that it was a restoration.

References

Bibliography

Chapen, Frederick H. The Land of the Cliff-Dwellers. Appalachian Mountain Club, W. B. Clarke and Co., Boston, 1892.  Reprinted by the University of Arizona Press, with notes and foreword by Robert H. Lister, 1988.  .
Noble, David Grant. "Ancient Ruins of the Southwest", pp. 36–43.Northland Publishing, Flagstaff, Arizona 1995. .
Oppelt, Norman T.  "Guide to Prehistoric Ruins of the Southwest", pp. 159–161. Pruett Publishing, Boulder, Colorado, 1989. .

External links

Cliff Palace at National Park Service
Mesa Verde National Park at National Park Service
Map showing location of Cliff Palace at National Park Service

Buildings and structures completed in the 12th century
Mesa Verde National Park
Cliff dwellings
Dwellings of the Pueblo peoples
Puebloan buildings and structures
Ancient Puebloan archaeological sites in Colorado
Archaeological museums in Colorado
Native American history of Colorado
Buildings and structures in Montezuma County, Colorado
Landmarks in Colorado
Pre-Columbian cultural areas
Oasisamerica cultures
Ruins in the United States
Former populated places in Colorado
Historic house museums in Colorado
Museums in Montezuma County, Colorado
Former populated places in Montezuma County, Colorado